Rolandas Džiaukštas (born 1 April 1978) is a Lithuanian professional football coach and a former player.

International career 
Džiaukštas made 40 appearances for the Lithuania national football team from 1998 to 2007.

Personal 
He stands 1.86 m tall and weighs 80 kg.

References

1978 births
Living people
Lithuanian footballers
Lithuania international footballers
FC Saturn Ramenskoye players
Russian Premier League players
Lithuanian expatriate footballers
Expatriate footballers in Russia
FC Baltika Kaliningrad players
FC Moscow players
FK Žalgiris players
Association football defenders
Lithuanian football managers